This article provides an overview of telecommunications in Lithuania, including radio, television, telephones, and the Internet.

The Communications Regulatory Authority of the Republic of Lithuania (RRT) is Lithuania's independent communications-industry regulator. It was established under the Law on Telecommunications and the provisions of the European Union Directives to ensure that the industry remain competitive.

Radio 

 Three radio networks operated by the public broadcaster (2007). 
 Many privately owned commercial broadcasters, many with repeater stations in various regions throughout the country (2007).
 Radios: 1.9 million (1997).

Television 

 Three channels operated by the public broadcaster, with the third, a satellite channel, introduced in 2014. 
 Various privately owned commercial TV broadcasters operate national and multiple regional channels (2007).
 Many privately owned local TV stations (2007).
 Multi-channel cable and satellite TV services are available (2007).
 Televisions: 1.7 million (1997).

Telephones 

 Main lines: 667,300 lines in use (2012), 89th in the world; 819,147 lines (2004).
 Mobile cellular: 5 million lines, 110th in the world (2012).
 Telephone system: adequate, but is being modernised to provide an improved international capability and better residential access (2010).
 Domestic: national fibre-optic cable interurban trunk system; rapid expansion of mobile-cellular services has resulted in a steady decline in the number of fixed-line connections; mobile-cellular teledensity stands at about 140 per 100 persons (2010).
 International: major international connections to Denmark, Sweden, and Norway by submarine cable for further transmission by satellite; landline connections to Latvia and Poland (2010).
 Country calling code: 370.

Internet 
 Country code (top-level domain): .lt
 Internet Service Providers: 32 ISPs (2001).
 Internet hosts: 1.2 million, 43rd in the world (2012).
 IPv4: 2.2 million, 0.1% of the world total, 635 per 1000 people (2012). 
 Internet users: 2.4 million users, 85th in the world; 68.0% of the population, 50th in the world (2012). 2.1 million users, 59.2% of the population (2008).
 Fixed broadband: 688,475 subscribers, 62nd in the world; 19.5% of the population, 49th in the world (2012). 	
 Mobile broadband: 301,488 subscribers, 106th in the world; 8.6% of the population, 97th in the world (2012). According to Lithuania's national regulator RRT, around 2 million Lithuanian telephone subscribers (out of a population of 3.3 million people) used mobile internet as of 2014.
 Lithuania has the highest FTTH (Fiber to the home) penetration rate in Europe (36.8% in September 2016) according to FTTH Council Europe.
 ADSL services in Lithuania are provided by the monopoly carrier Teo LT. In the future this service might be used by other ISPs for their retail services.
 According to a study by Ookla Net Metrics, Lithuania had the second fastest Internet download and the fastest upload speed in the world in June 2013.
 In 2013 at least two ISPs in Lithuania offered download speeds of up to 300 Mbit/s in their standard packages for home users.
 In 2014 fastest internet for home users in Lithuania was offered by "Penki" (till 2 December 2018 "Skynet") internet provider. Maximum internet speed was up to 1Gbit/s. In the second and third places are Teo LT and Cgates with maximum internet speed up to 500Mbit/s.
 Lithuania reportedly is the first country to introduce Local Breakout (LBO) technology offering cheap mobile internet for travellers which allows avoidance of big data roaming charges.

Censorship
There are no government restrictions on access to the Internet or credible reports that the government monitors e-mail or Internet chat rooms without appropriate legal authority. Individuals and groups generally engage in the free expression of views via the Internet, including by e-mail, but authorities prosecute people for openly posting material on the Internet that authorities considered to be inciting hatred.

The constitution provides for freedom of speech and press, and the government generally respects these rights in practice. An independent press, an effective judiciary, and a functioning democratic political system combine to promote these freedoms. However, the constitutional definition of freedom of expression does not protect certain acts, such as incitement to national, racial, religious, or social hatred, violence and discrimination, or slander, and disinformation. It is a crime to deny or "grossly trivialise" Soviet or Nazi German crimes against Lithuania or its citizens, or to deny genocide, crimes against humanity, or war crimes. In the first 11 months of 2012 authorities initiated investigations into 259 allegations of incitement of hatred and six of incitement of discrimination, most of them over the Internet. Authorities forwarded 69 of those allegations to the courts for trial, closed 68, and suspended 113 for lack of evidence; the others remained under investigation. Most allegations of incitement of hatred involved racist or anti-Semitic expression, or hostility based on sexual orientation, gender identity, or nationality.

It is a crime to disseminate information that is both untrue and damaging to an individual's honour and dignity. Libel is punishable by a fine or imprisonment of up to one year, or up to two years for libellous material disseminated through the mass media. While it is illegal to publish material "detrimental to minors’ bodies" or thought processes, information promoting the sexual abuse and harassment of minors, promoting sexual relations among minors, or "sexual relations", the law is not often invoked and there are no indications that it adversely affects freedom of the media.

The constitution prohibits arbitrary interference in an individual's personal correspondence or private and family life, but there were reports that the government did not respect these prohibitions in practice. The law requires authorities to obtain judicial authorisation before searching an individual's premises and prohibits the indiscriminate monitoring by government or other parties of citizens’ correspondence or communications. However, domestic human rights groups allege that the government does not properly enforce the law.

Free wi-fi zones
Vilnius- Cathedral Square, Gediminas Avenue, Vokiečių Street, Vilnius International Airport
Kaunas- Laisvė Avenue
Klaipėda- Theatre Square, The New Ferry
Šiauliai- Vilnius pedestrian boulevard
Panevėžys- Laisvė Square, Senvagė.

See also

 Media of Lithuania
 LITNET, an academic and research network in Lithuania
 Ministry of Transport and Communications (Lithuania)

References

External links
 .lt domain registrar, Kaunas University of Technology.

 
Lithuania
Internet in Lithuania